The Center-Democratic Integration is a political group in the Central American Parliament, or PARLACEN. It is made up of member parties across Central America, ranging from centre-left to centre-right, and holds a plurality of 48 seats in the Central American Parliament.

Members

Current

Former

See also
Parliamentary Group of the Left
Central American Parliament

References

Politics of Central America
1991 establishments in North America